The Barracks is a historic plantation house located at Tarboro, Edgecombe County, North Carolina. It was built about 1858, and is a two-story, brick dwelling with Greek Revival and Italianate style design elements.  It features a central projecting bay with distyle pedimented portico.  The portico has fluted columns and a frieze.  The house is topped by a cross-gable roof and cupola.

It was listed on the National Register of Historic Places in 1971. It is located in the Tarboro Historic District.

References

Plantation houses in North Carolina
Houses on the National Register of Historic Places in North Carolina
Greek Revival houses in North Carolina
Italianate architecture in North Carolina
Houses completed in 1858
Houses in Edgecombe County, North Carolina
National Register of Historic Places in Edgecombe County, North Carolina
Individually listed contributing properties to historic districts on the National Register in North Carolina